ACBL may refer to:

 Actor-Based Concurrent Language, a family of programming languages
 Adarsh Co-operative Bank, in India
 American Contract Bridge League, a bridge membership organization in North America
 Atlantic Collegiate Baseball League, located in the US Mid-Atlantic region

See also
 ABCL (disambiguation)